Dibamus deharvengi is a legless lizard endemic to Vietnam.

References

Dibamus
Reptiles of Vietnam
Reptiles described in 1999